Dempak Bazar (also Romanized as Dempak Bāzār; also known as Dempag and Dempak) is a village in Bahu Kalat Rural District, Dashtiari District, Chabahar County, Sistan and Baluchestan Province, Iran. At the 2006 census, its population was 1,599, in 315 families.

References 

Populated places in Chabahar County